Solhabad may refer to:
 Solhabad, Bajestan, in Razavi Khorasan Province
 Solhabad, Semnan
 Solhabad, alternate name of Salehabadu, in Semnan Province

See also
 Salehabad (disambiguation)